St. George is a station on Line 1 Yonge–University and Line 2 Bloor–Danforth of the Toronto subway. It is located north of Bloor Street West between St. George Street and Bedford Road. It is the second-busiest station in the system after Bloor–Yonge station, serving a combined total of approximately  people a day. Wi-Fi service is available at this station.

Entrances

 The St. George Street entrance is an unstaffed automatic entrance. It is located on the east side of St. George Street just north of Bloor Street West at 
 The Bedford entrance is wheelchair accessible and is staffed during all hours of operation. Patrons board the 26 Dupont bus from a platform within the station's fare-paid area. 
 There is also an unstaffed automatic entrance from Ontario Institute for Studies in Education.

History

The station was first opened on February 28, 1963, for the Yonge–University line, followed by the Bloor–Danforth line on February 26, 1966.

Between 1963 and 1966, there was a direct surface connection at the Bedford Road subway entrance to Bloor and Danforth streetcars. The "Bedford Loop" was immediately south of the station structure and had opened in 1954 to provide a short turn facility for westbound streetcars serving Bloor station on the new Yonge Subway. Streetcars entered from Bedford Road, turned west into the loop beside the station, and exited south on to Bloor Street. The platform was on the east side of what is now the Ontario Institute for Studies in Education, with a TTC transformer station constructed at the former entrance and the exit where the Bloor–Bedford Parkette is situated. This loop gave passengers travelling in peak hours a more direct connection between the subway and eastbound and westbound streetcars than walking to/from the curbside stops. The loop closed in February 1966 when streetcar routes were replaced by the Bloor–Danforth line.

In 1999, this station became accessible with elevators.

In late August 2019, the TTC installed platform door markers along the edge of the station's southbound platform as a pilot to improve customer flow when a southbound train is in station. These indicate where customers waiting to board should stand to avoid obstructing customers leaving the train. Automated train control (ATC) ensures that train doors and decals perfectly match up. Blue decals are located near the train doors for accessible seating; customers with mobility problems have priority boarding.

Interlining

St. George and  stations are both two-level stations with two platforms, with Line 1 on the upper level, and Line 2 on the lower level at St. George. The tracks to and from Museum connect to the upper-level platforms at St. George and the lower-level platforms at Bay stations, while the tracks along Bloor use the lower level at St. George and the upper level at Bay. From February to September 1966, all three sides of the wye were used in regular service: from each of three termini—, and —trains ran alternately to the other two (between Eglinton and Museum they went via ).

After the six months of interlining, the Bloor–Danforth Line became a separate route and the lower platforms at Bay (sometimes called Lower Bay) were closed. Lower Bay is sometimes used as a movie or TV set, and has been used for platform-surface experiments.

Paul Arthur signage

Some areas of the station contain wayfinding signage with the image of a crest with a dragon, referencing the Christian legend of St. George. However, St. George Street is actually named for Quetton St. George, a French-born British citizen who lived in Toronto in the 19th century. The signs were designed by Paul Arthur and installed in 1993 as part of a new system of wayfinding signage, which was to be implemented in the entire subway system. Ultimately, the TTC did not go through with the project but did not remove the prototypes either, preserving some of Arthur's designs.

A further wayfinding project began implementation in 2014: using circles with the colour and number of each line to identify them more easily. Signage for that project rolled out at  station in March of that year, with St. George set to be the next to follow.

Subway infrastructure in the vicinity

Upon leaving the station, the line curves south by 90 degrees to run under Queen's Park (the street). The two tracks split into separate tunnels in this area, briefly running at different levels to form a grade-separated junction with the second pair of link tracks from the Bloor–Danforth line, which curves in from the east.

Tenants
 Gateway Newstands (one at the St. George entrance/exit and another at the Bedford entrance/exit)

Nearby landmarks
Nearby landmarks include the Bata Shoe Museum, University of Toronto Schools, the north side of the University of Toronto, the Royal Conservatory of Music, the Chinese Consul General, the Royal Ontario Museum, and the York Club.

Surface connections 

TTC routes serving the station include:

References

External links

Line 1 Yonge–University stations
Line 2 Bloor–Danforth stations
Railway stations in Canada opened in 1963
1963 establishments in Ontario
Railway stations in Canada at university and college campuses